Norway competed at the 2018 Winter Olympics in PyeongChang, South Korea, from 9 to 25 February 2018. It was represented by 109 competitors in 11 sports.

Norway was the most successful nation at the games with 39 total medals, setting a new record for the most medals won by a country at a single Winter Olympics. The previous record of 37 was set by the United States at the 2010 Winter Olympics. Norway, together with Germany, also matched the record of most gold medals at a single Winter Olympics with 14 gold, originally set by Canada at the 2010 Winter Olympics.

Cross-country skier Marit Bjørgen was the most successful athlete of the games, with five medals, while her male colleagues Johannes Høsflot Klæbo, Simen Hegstad Krüger and Martin Johnsrud Sundby won three each. Biathletes Johannes Thingnes Bø and Emil Hegle Svendsen and ski jumper Robert Johansson also won three medals each. Additional nine Norwegian athletes won two medals each: Ragnhild Haga, Johann André Forfang, Håvard Lorentzen, Sverre Lunde Pedersen, Ragnhild Mowinckel, Marte Olsbu, Kjetil Jansrud, Tiril Eckhoff and Maiken Caspersen Falla.

Medalists

Outline
Prior to the games, the Norwegian Olympic sports authority Olympiatoppen announced an official goal of winning 30 medals and making it into the top three on the medal table.

Competitors
The following is the list of number of competitors participating at the Games per sport/discipline.

Alpine skiing 

Men

Women

Mixed

Biathlon 

Based on their Nations Cup rankings in the 2016–17 Biathlon World Cup, Norway has qualified 6 men and 5 women.

Men

Women

Mixed

Cross-country skiing 

Distance
Men

Women

Sprint
Men

Women

Curling 

Norway has qualified seven athletes.

Summary

Men's tournament
Norway has qualified a men's team by earning enough points in the last two World Curling Championships.

Round-robin
Norway has a bye in draws 1, 5 and 9.

Draw 2
Wednesday, 14 February, 20:05

Draw 3
Thursday, 15 February, 14:05

Draw 4
Friday, 16 February, 09:05

Draw 6
Saturday, 17 February, 14:05

Draw 7
Sunday, 18 February, 09:05

Draw 8
Sunday, 18 February, 20:05

Draw 10
Tuesday, 20 February, 09:05

Draw 11
Tuesday, 20 February, 20:05

Draw 12
Wednesday, 21 February, 14:05

Mixed doubles

Norway has qualified a mixed doubles team by earning enough points in the last two World Mixed Doubles Curling Championships. Norway eventually finished in 4th place behind OAR, but on the 22nd of February it was confirmed that the male OAR competitor had tested positive for meldonium, a banned substance. This meant that the OAR team would be stripped of their medal, and Norway would instead receive the bronze medal for mixed doubles curling.

Draw 1
Thursday, February 8, 9:05

Draw 2
Thursday, February 8, 20:04

Draw 3
Friday, February 9, 8:35

Draw 4
Friday, February 9, 13:35

Draw 5
Saturday, February 10, 9:05

Draw 6
Saturday, February 10, 20:04

Draw 7
Sunday, February 11, 9:05

Tiebreaker
Sunday, February 11, 20:05

Semifinal
Monday, February 12, 9:05

Bronze-medal game
Tuesday, February 13, 9:05

Freestyle skiing 

Moguls

Slopestyle

Ice hockey 

Summary

Men's tournament

Norway men's national ice hockey team qualified by winning the final qualification tournament in Oslo, Norway.

Team roster

Preliminary round

Qualification playoffs

Quarterfinal

Nordic combined 
Norway has qualified 5 athletes.

Skeleton 
Norway qualified a single male athlete for the skeleton event. Former Olympic champion Maya Pederson had also competed for Norway in a bid to qualify for the 2018 Olympics but came up short.  Male rider Alexander Henning Hannsen received a reallocation invitation.

Ski jumping 
Norway has qualified 2 women and 5 men.

Men

Anders Fannemel was the back-up jumper for Norway.

Women

Snowboarding 

Freestyle

Mons Røisland sustained injuries before the final and therefore withdrew from the slopestyle competition and the rest of the 2018 Winter Olympics.

Speed skating 

Men

Women

Mass start

Team pursuit

Reactions
On or about 6 February 2018 before the games, the Norwegian Olympic Team chefs inadvertently ordered 15,000 eggs from South Korea because of a Google Translate error. They only wanted 1,500 eggs. There was a tweet "OL-leiren bestilte 1500 egg gjennom å oversette via Google Translate. Men det slo feil. 15.000 ble levert på døra. Vi ønsker lykke til og håper at de norske gullhåpene er glade – veldig glade – i egg".

References

Nations at the 2018 Winter Olympics
2018
Winter Olympics